Robert H. Crosthwaite is an American politician from Maine. A Republican, Crosthwaite represented District 38, which included Ellsworth, Otis and Trenton, all in Hancock County while in the Maine House of Representatives. He served from 2002 to 2008, including two years (2006-2008) as Assistant Minority Leader.

Crosthwaite has also served multiple terms on the Ellsworth City Council, including re-election in November 2012.

References

Year of birth missing (living people)
Living people
People from Ellsworth, Maine
Maine city council members
Republican Party members of the Maine House of Representatives